The 1955 New Mexico Lobos football team represented the University of New Mexico in the Skyline Conference during the 1955 college football season.  In their third and final season under head coach Bob Titchenal, the Lobos compiled a 2–8 record (1–5 against Skyline opponents), finished seventh in the conference, were shutout in five games (including four in a row), and were outscored by all opponents by a total of 213 to 61.

After the season ended, the student newspaper (the Lobo) published an editorial criticizing Titchenal for the team's poor showing, pointing out that the university had expended $80,000 for football players since 1953 and noting that the teams had gotten steadily worse under Titchenal. Titchenal responded with a press conference in which he stated that he had done the best he could under university policy, which did not allow him to grant athletic scholarships and which had cut the team's equipment budget in half. Titchenal was ultimately fired as the school's football coach on December 7, 1955.

Schedule

References

New Mexico
New Mexico Lobos football seasons
New Mexico Lobos football